Nandnee, also spelleda as Nandani, is a village in the Solapur district in Pune division of Desh region of Maharashtra state in India.

Demographics
According to the 2011 census Nandani total population is 1,590, of which 801 are males while 789 are females. Population of children with age 0-6 is 223 which makes up 14.03% of total population. Literacy rate of Nandani village was 67.96% compared to 82.34% of Maharashtra. In Nandani Male literacy stands at 81.42% while female literacy rate was 54.28%.

Transport
Nandnee is located on National Highway 52 which connects Sangrur in Punjab to Ankola in Karnataka.

References

External links
 Nandani village

Villages in Solapur district